War Is Hell was a horror/war comic book series from Marvel Comics in 1973–1975. For its first six issues, it featured reprints of old war comics, followed by two issues of reprints of Sgt. Fury and his Howling Commandos. Beginning in issue #9, the series featured new material; the star of the series became Death, who forced a dishonorable Polish-American man named John Kowalski, killed in the invasion of Poland, to die countless deaths from other lives. A War Is Hell limited series featuring Phantom Eagle appeared in 2008.

John Kowalski
During the series, Kowalski inhabited different bodies of those about to die, not necessarily of the same side or sex, during World War II, including both the European and Pacific theatres, and needed to change things for the better before he was killed. Death would summon him from the nether regions each story, and Kowalski wondered how many times he would have to do so as penance. The series was created by writers Tony Isabella, Roy Thomas, and Chris Claremont with an uncredited assist from Steve Gerber on issue #9 (acknowledged in the letter column of issue #12), and artists Dick Ayers and Frank Springer.

The series was canceled with issue #15, and Claremont's intentions for Kowalski were revealed when he wrote volume 2 of Man-Thing and incorporated the character into its final two issues (#s 10 & 11). By this point (the early 1980s), Kowalski had become an aspect of Death. He made Barbie Bannister (a recently orphaned by murder rich girl introduced by Claremont in Man-Thing vol. 2 #5) another aspect of Death as they battled Sheriff John Daltry, who was possessed by the sword of Captain Fate. He caused the deaths of Doctor Strange, Man-Thing, Jennifer Kale, and Chris Claremont himself, although these deaths were undone by the end of the story, in order to battle Thog the Nether-Spawn, who was using Fate and Daltry as his pawns in another gambit to take over Earth-616.

Kowalski later appeared with Scarlet Witch in a story by Dennis Mallonee (writer) and  John Ridgway (artist) in Solo Avengers #5.

Bibliography
War Is Hell #9 — "War Is Hell!" Isabella, Thomas, Claremont, [Gerber], Ayers, Springer (19 pp)
War Is Hell #10 — "The Corridor" Isabella, Claremont, Ayers, Springer (18 pp)
War Is Hell #11 — "Winter Kill" Claremont, Perlin, Trapani (18 pp)
War Is Hell #12 — "My Love Must Die" Claremont, Perlin, Hunt (19 pp) 
War Is Hell #13 — "Today Is a Lovely Day to Die" Claremont and Trimpe (17 pp)
War Is Hell #14 — "The Duty of a Man" Claremont and Evans (17 pp)
War Is Hell #15 — "A Christmas Eve in Hell" Claremont and Trimpe (17 pp)
Man-Thing vol. 2 #10 — "Came the Dark Man, Walkin', Walkin'..." Claremont, Perlin, Wiacek (22 pp)
Man-Thing vol. 2 #11 — "Hell's Gate!" Claremont, Mayerik, Wiacek (22 pp)
Solo Avengers #5 — "A Love That Never Dies" Mallonee and Ridgway (11 pp)

Phantom Eagle

In 2008, a new five-issue limited series, titled War Is Hell: The First Flight of the Phantom Eagle, appeared under the MAX imprint. Phantom Eagle (Lt. Karl Kaufman) was a World War I hero created by Gary Friedrich and artist Herb Trimpe (artist) in 1968, and the new story was by Garth Ennis (writer) and Howard Chaykin (artist).

Reprints
The series began as a reprint book, mostly from Atlas Comics-era war comics, adding Sgt. Fury for its last two issues before printing new material.  The first six issues contained four stories an issue, each around five pages:

Reprinting stories from Battle #30 (1 story) and #55 (3 stories)
Reprinting stories from Battle Action #30, (1 story) Battlefront #30 (2 stories), and Battle #55 (1 story)
Reprinting stories from Battle Action #15 (1 story) and G.I. Tales #5 (3 stories)
Reprinting stories from Battleground #15 (3 stories), and War Comics #17 (1 story)
Reprinting stories from Battlefront #34 (1 story), and Battleground #20 (1 story) and # 18 (2 stories)
Reprinting stories from War Comics #30, "Court Martial" by Werner Roth, Battleground #15, and War Comics #17
Reprinting Sgt. Fury and his Howling Commandos #17
Reprinting Sgt. Fury and his Howling Commandos #18

Collected editions

War is Hell: The First Flight of the Phantom Eagle collects War is Hell: The First Flight of the Phantom Eagle #1-5 (Marvel Max, hardcover, 120 pages, November 2008)
Marvel Ghost Stories includes War is Hell #9 (176 pages, October 2011)
Marvel Universe by Chris Claremont includes War is Hell #9-15 (1144 pages, August 2017)

References

External links 
 

1973 comics debuts
2008 comics debuts
Marvel Comics set during World War II
Comics set during World War I
Horror comics
War comics published by Marvel Comics